Euphorbia is a highly diverse plant genus, comprising some 5,000 currently accepted taxa.

This is an alphabetical list of the Euphorbia species and notable intraspecific taxa.

The list includes the former (and never generally accepted) genus Chamaesyce, as well as the related genera Elaeophorbia, Endadenium, Monadenium, Synadenium and Pedilanthus which according to recent DNA sequence-based phylogenetic studies are all nested within Euphorbia

Noticeably succulent plants are marked by (s).

A

Euphorbia aaron-rossii A.H. Holmgren & N.H. Holmgren – Marble Canyon spurge
Euphorbia abdelkuri Balf.f. (s)
Euphorbia abdita (Burch.) Radcl.-Sm.
Euphorbia abdulghafooriana Abedin
Euphorbia abramsiana L.C. Wheeler - Abrams' sandmat
Euphorbia abyssinica J.F. Gmel. (s)
Euphorbia acalyphoides Hochst. ex Boiss.
Euphorbia acalyphoides ssp. acalyphoides
Euphorbia acalyphoides ssp. cicatricosa S.Carter
Euphorbia acanthodes Akhani (s)
Euphorbia acanthothamnos Heldr. & Sart. – Greek spiny spurge (s)
Euphorbia acerensis Boiss.
Euphorbia acervata S.Carter (s)
Euphorbia actinoclada S.Carter (s)
Euphorbia aculeata Forssk. (s)
Euphorbia adenochila S.Carter (s)
Euphorbia adenochlora C.Morren & Decne.
Euphorbia adenopoda Baillon (s)
Euphorbia adenopoda ssp. adenopoda (s)
Euphorbia adenopoda ssp. canescens (Proctor) Oudejans (s)
Euphorbia adenopoda ssp. gundlachii (Urb.) Oudejans (s)
Euphorbia adenopoda ssp. pergamena (Small) Oudejans (s)
Euphorbia adenoptera Bertol.
Euphorbia adiantoides Lam.
Euphorbia adjurana P.R.O.Bally & S.Carter (s)
Euphorbia aellenii Rech.f.
Euphorbia aequoris N.E.Br. (s)
Euphorbia aeruginosa Schweick. (s)
Euphorbia aggregata A.Berger (s)
Euphorbia aggregata var. aggregata (s)
Euphorbia aggregata var. alternicolor  (N.E.Br.) A.C.White, R.A.Dyer & B.Sloane (s)
Euphorbia agowensis Hochst. ex Boiss. (s)
Euphorbia agowensis var. agowensis (s)
Euphorbia agowensis var. pseudoholstii  (Pax) P.R.O.Bally & S.Carter (s)
Euphorbia agraria M.Bieb.  – Urban spurge
Euphorbia agraria var. agraria
Euphorbia agraria var. euboea (Halácsy) Hayek
Euphorbia agraria var. subhastata (De Vis) Griseb.
Euphorbia akenocarpa Guss.
Euphorbia alaica (Prokh.) Prokh.
Euphorbia alainii Oudejans
Euphorbia alata Hook. (s)
Euphorbia alatavica Boiss.
Euphorbia alatocaulis V.W.Steinm. & Felger
Euphorbia albanica N.E.Br. (s)
Euphorbia albertensis N.E.Br. (s)
Euphorbia albiflora Taub.
Euphorbia albipollinifera L.C.Leach (s)
Euphorbia albomarginata – Rattlesnake Weed, White-margined Sandmat
Euphorbia alcicornis Baker (s)
Euphorbia aleppica L.
Euphorbia aleppica var. aleppica
Euphorbia aleppica var. prostrata Kasapligil
Euphorbia alfredii Rauh (s)
Euphorbia allocarpa S.Carter
Euphorbia alluaudii Drake
Euphorbia alpina C.A.Mey. ex Ledeb.
Euphorbia alpina var. alpina
Euphorbia alpina var. rupicola Baikov
Euphorbia alsiniflora Baillon
Euphorbia alsinifolia Boiss.
Euphorbia alsinoides Miq.
Euphorbia alta Norton
Euphorbia altaica C.A.Mey. ex Ledeb.
Euphorbia altaica var. altaica
Euphorbia altaica var. pilosa Stschegl.
Euphorbia altaica var. sajanensis Boiss.
Euphorbia altissima Boiss.
Euphorbia altissima var. altissima
Euphorbia altissima var. glabrescens  M.S.Khan
Euphorbia altotibetica Paulsen ex Ostenf. & Paulsen
Euphorbia amandii Oudejans
Euphorbia amarifontana N.E.Br. (s)
Euphorbia ambacensis N.E.Br.
Euphorbia ambarivatoensis Rauh & Bard.-Vauc. (s)
Euphorbia ambovombensis Rauh & Razaf. (s)
Euphorbia ambovombensis var. ambovombensis (s)
Euphorbia ambovombensis var. ambatomenaensis Rebmann (s)
Euphorbia ambroseae L.C.Leach (s)
Euphorbia ambroseae var. ambroseae (s)
Euphorbia ambroseae var. spinosa L.C.Leach (s)
Euphorbia ambukensis Stepanov
Euphorbia amicorum S.Carter (s)
Euphorbia ammak Schweinf. (s)
Euphorbia ammatotricha Boiss.
Euphorbia ammophila S.Carter & Dioli
Euphorbia amphimalaca Standl.
Euphorbia amplexicaulis Hook.f.
Euphorbia ampliphylla Pax (s)
Euphorbia amygdaloides L. – Wood spurge
Euphorbia amygdaloides ssp. amygdaloides
Euphorbia amygdaloides ssp. amygdaloides var. amygdaloides
Euphorbia amygdaloides ssp. amygdaloides var. ligulata (Chaub.) Boiss. 1862 
Euphorbia amygdaloides ssp. arbuscula Meusel
Euphorbia amygdaloides ssp. heldreichii (Orph. ex Boiss.) Aldén
Euphorbia amygdaloides ssp. robbiae (Turrill) Radcl.-Sm.
Euphorbia amygdaloides ssp. semiperfoliata (Viv.) Radcl.-Sm.
Euphorbia anacampseros Boiss.
Euphorbia anacampseros var. anacampseros
Euphorbia anacampseros var. tmolea M.S.Khan
Euphorbia anachoreta Svent. (s)
Euphorbia analalavensis Leandri1966 (s)
Euphorbia analamerae Leandri1945
Euphorbia analavelonensis Rauh & Mangelsdorff (s)
Euphorbia andrachnoides Schrenk
Euphorbia androsaemifolia Willd. ex Schltdl.
Euphorbia angrae N.E.Br. (s)
Euphorbia angularis Klotzsch (s)
Euphorbia angulata Jacq.
Euphorbia angusta  Engelm. (s)
Euphorbia angustiflora Pax (s)
Euphorbia anisopetala (Prokh.) Prokh.
Euphorbia ankaranae Leandri (s)
Euphorbia ankarensis Boiteau (s)
Euphorbia ankazobensis Rauh & Hofstätter (s)
Euphorbia annamarieae Rauh (s)
Euphorbia anoplia Stapf (s)
Euphorbia anthonyi Brandegee (= Chamaesyce anthonyi)
Euphorbia anthula Lavrent. & Papan.
Euphorbia antilibanotica Mouterde
Euphorbia antiquorum L. (s)
Euphorbia antisyphilitica  – "Candelilla", "wax plant" (s)
Euphorbia antonii Oudejans
Euphorbia antso Denis (s)
Euphorbia anychioides Boiss.
Euphorbia apatzingana McVaugh
Euphorbia aphylla Brouss. ex Willd. – Leafless spurge, tolda (s)
Euphorbia apicata L.C.Wheeler
Euphorbia apios L.
Euphorbia apocynoides Klotzsch
Euphorbia appariciana Rizzini
Euphorbia appendiculata P.R.O.Bally & S.Carter ex S.Carter
Euphorbia applanata Thulin & Al-Gifri
Euphorbia aprica Baillon (s)
Euphorbia apurimacensis Croizat
Euphorbia arabica Hochst. & Steud. ex T.Anderson
Euphorbia arabicoides N.E.Br.
Euphorbia arahaka H.Poisson (s)
Euphorbia araucana Phil.
Euphorbia arbuscula Balf.f. (s)
Euphorbia arbuscula var. arbuscula (s)
Euphorbia arbuscula var. Montana Balf.f. (s)
Euphorbia arceuthobioides Boiss. (s)
Euphorbia ardonensis Galushko
Euphorbia arenaria Kunth
Euphorbia arenarioides Gagnep.
Euphorbia argillosa Chodat & E.Hassler
Euphorbia arguta Banks & Sol.
Euphorbia arguta var. arguta
Euphorbia arguta var. dasycarpa Plitmann
Euphorbia arida N.E.Br. (s)
Euphorbia ariensis Kunth
Euphorbia ariensis var. ariensis
Euphorbia ariensis var. villicaulis Fernald
Euphorbia aristata Schmalh.
Euphorbia arizonica Engelm.
Euphorbia armena Prokh.
Euphorbia armourii Millsp.
Euphorbia armstrongiana Boiss.
Euphorbia arnottiana Endl.
Euphorbia arrecta N.E.Br. ex R.E.Fr. (s)
Euphorbia arteagae W.R.Buck & Huft (s)
Euphorbia articulata Burm. (s)
Euphorbia artifolia N.E.Br.
Euphorbia arundelana Bartlett
Euphorbia arvalis Boiss. & Heldr. ex Boiss.
Euphorbia arvalis ssp. arvalis
Euphorbia arvalis ssp. longistyla  (Litard. & Maire) Molero, Rovira & J.Vicens
Euphorbia asclepiadea Milne-Redh. (s)
Euphorbia aserbajdzhanica Bordz.
Euphorbia aspericaulis Pax (s)
Euphorbia asthenacantha S.Carter (s)
Euphorbia astroites Fisch. & C.A.Mey.
Euphorbia astrophora Marx (s)
Euphorbia astyla Engelm. ex Boiss.
Euphorbia atlantis Maire
Euphorbia atlantis var. atlantis
Euphorbia atlantis var. leiocarpa (Boiss.) Oudejans
Euphorbia atlantis var. major (Boiss.) Oudejans
Euphorbia atoto G.Forst. (s)
Euphorbia atrispina N.E.Br. (s)
Euphorbia atrispina var. atrispina (s)
Euphorbia atrispina var. viridis A.C.White, R.A.Dyer & B.Sloane (s)
Euphorbia atrocarmesina L.C.Leach (s)
Euphorbia atrocarmesina ssp. arborea L.C.Leach (s)
Euphorbia atrocarmesina ssp. atrocarmesina (s)
Euphorbia atrococca A.Heller
Euphorbia atroflora S.Carter (s)
Euphorbia atropurpurea Brouss. ex Willd. (s)
Euphorbia atropurpurea var. atropurpurea (s)
Euphorbia atropurpurea var. atropurpurea f. atropurpurea (s)
Euphorbia atropurpurea var. atropurpurea f. lutea A.Santos (s)
Euphorbia atropurpurea var. modesta Svent. (s)
Euphorbia atrox S.Carter (s)
Euphorbia attastoma Rizzini (s)
Euphorbia attastoma var. attastoma (s)
Euphorbia attastoma var. xanthochlora Rizzini (s)
Euphorbia aucheri Boiss.
Euphorbia aulacosperma Boiss.
Euphorbia aureoviridiflora (Rauh) Rauh (s)
Euphorbia auricularia Boiss.
Euphorbia australis Boiss.
Euphorbia austriaca A.Kern.
Euphorbia austroanatolica Hub.Mor. & M.S.Khan ex M.S.Khan
Euphorbia avasmontana Dinter (s)
Euphorbia avasmontana var. avasmontana (s)
Euphorbia avasmontana var. sagittaria (Marloth) A.C.White, R.A.Dyer & B.Sloane (s)
Euphorbia awashensis M.G.Gilbert (s)
Euphorbia azorica Hochst. ex Seub. - endemic to the archipelago of the Azores

B

Euphorbia baga A.Chev. (s)
Euphorbia baga var. baga (s)
Euphorbia baga var. parviflora L.E.Newton (s)
Euphorbia bahiensis (Klotzsch & Garcke ex Klotzsch) Boiss.
Euphorbia baioensis S.Carter (s)
Euphorbia balakrishnanii Binojk. & Gopalan
Euphorbia balearica (Willk.) A.M.Romo
Euphorbia baleensis M.G.Gilbert
Euphorbia balbisii Boiss.
Euphorbia baliola N.E.Br. (s)
Euphorbia ballyana Rauh (s)
Euphorbia ballyi S.Carter (s)
Euphorbia balsamifera  Aiton (s)
Euphorbia balsamifera ssp. adenensis  (Deflers) P.R.O.Bally (s)
Euphorbia balsamifera ssp. balsamifera (s)
Euphorbia banae Rauh (s)
Euphorbia baradii S.Carter (s)
Euphorbia barbicarina (Millsp.) Standl.
Euphorbia barbicollis P.R.O.Bally (s)
Euphorbia bariensis S.Carter (s)
Euphorbia barkeri Urb. & Ekman ex Urb.
Euphorbia barnardii A.C.White, R.A.Dyer & B.Sloane (s)
Euphorbia barnesii (Millsp.) Oudejans
Euphorbia barnhartii Croizat (s)
Euphorbia barrelieri Savi
Euphorbia bartolomaei Greene
Euphorbia basarabica Prodan
Euphorbia baselicis Ten.
Euphorbia baueri Engelm. ex Boiss.
Euphorbia baumii Pax
Euphorbia baxanica Galushko
Euphorbia bayeri L.C.Leach (s)
Euphorbia baylissii L.C.Leach (s)
Euphorbia beamanii M.C.Johnst.
Euphorbia beharensis Leandri (s)
Euphorbia beharensis var. adpressifolia Rauh (s)
Euphorbia beharensis var. beharensis (s)
Euphorbia beharensis var. gullemetii  (Ursch & Leandri) Rauh (s)
Euphorbia beharensis var. squarrosa Rauh (s)
Euphorbia beharensis var. truncata Rauh (s)
Euphorbia beillei A.Chev. (s)
Euphorbia bellica Hiern
Euphorbia bemarahaensis Rauh & Mangelsdorff (s)
Euphorbia benoistii Leandri
Euphorbia benthami Hiern
Euphorbia bergeri N.E.Br. (s)
Euphorbia bergii A.C.White, R.A.Dyer & B.Sloane (s)
Euphorbia berorohae Rauh & Hofstätter (s)
Euphorbia berotica N.E.Br. (s)
Euphorbia bertemariae Bisseret & Dioli (s)
Euphorbia berteroana Balb. ex Spreng.
Euphorbia berthelotii Bolle ex Boiss. (s)
Euphorbia berythae Boiss. & Blanche ex Boiss.
Euphorbia bessarabica Klokov
Euphorbia besseri (Klotzsch & Garcke ex Klotzsch) Boiss.
Euphorbia betacea Baillon (s)
Euphorbia betulicortex M.G.Gilbert (s)
Euphorbia bevilaniensis Croizat
Euphorbia biaculeata Denis (s)
Euphorbia bianoensis (Malaisse & Lecron) Bruyns (s) (= Monadenium bianoense)
Euphorbia bicapitata Brandegee
Euphorbia bicolor Engelm. & A.Gray - Snow-on-the-prairie
Euphorbia bicompacta Bruyns (s) (= Synadenium compactum)
Euphorbia bicompacta var. bicompacta (s) (= Synadenium compactum var. compactum)
Euphorbia bicompacta var. rubra (S.Carter) Bruyns 2006  (s) (= Synadenium compactum var. rubrum)
Euphorbia biconvexa Domin
Euphorbia bifidaHook. & Arn.
Euphorbia bifurcata Engelm. - Forked spurge
Euphorbia biharamulensis S.Carter (s)
Euphorbia bilobata Engelm. - Blackseed spurge
Euphorbia biramensis Urb.
Euphorbia biselegans Bruyns (s) (= Monadenium elegans)
Euphorbia bisellenbeckii Bruyns (s) (= Monadenium ellenbecki)
Euphorbia bisglobosa Bruyns (s) (= Monadenium globosum)
Euphorbia bitataensis M.G.Gilbert (s)
Euphorbia biumbellata Poir. (s)
Euphorbia biuncialis McVaugh
Euphorbia bivonae Steud. (s)
Euphorbia bivonae ssp. bivonae (s)
Euphorbia bivonae ssp. tunetana Murb. (s)
Euphorbia blatteri Oudejans
Euphorbia blepharophylla C.A.Mey. (s)
Euphorbia bodenghieniae (Malaisse & Lecron) Bruyns (s) (= Monadenium bodenghieniae)
Euphorbia blodgettii Engelm. ex Hitchc.
Euphorbia boerrhavifolia (Klotzsch & Garcke ex Klotzsch) Boiss.
Euphorbia boetica Boiss.
Euphorbia boinensis Denis ex Humbert & Leandri (s)
Euphorbia boissieri Baillon (s)
Euphorbia boissieriana (Woronow) Prokh.
Euphorbia boiteaui Leandri 1946(s)
Euphorbia boivinii Boiss.
Euphorbia boliviana Rusby
Euphorbia bolosii (Molero & Rovira) Molero & Rovira
Euphorbia bolusii N.E.Br. (s)
Euphorbia bombensis Jacq.
Euphorbia bongensis Kotschy & Peyr. ex Boiss. (s)
Euphorbia bongolavensis Rauh (s)
Euphorbia bonpaldii Sweet
Euphorbia boophthona C.A.Gardner
Euphorbia borbonica Boiss.
Euphorbia borealis Baikov
Euphorbia borenensis M.G.Gilbert ex S.Carter & M.G.Gilbert (s)
Euphorbia borodini Sambuk
Euphorbia bosseri Leandri (s)
Euphorbia bothae Lotsy & Goddijn (hybrid) (s)
Euphorbia bottae Boiss. 1862  (s)
Euphorbia bougheyi L.C.Leach (s)
Euphorbia bouleyi S.Moore
Euphorbia bourgaeana J.Gay ex Boiss. (s)
Euphorbia brachiata (Klotzsch & Garcke) E.Mey. ex Boiss. (s)
Euphorbia brachycera Engelm. - Horned spurge
Euphorbia brachyphylla Denis
Euphorbia bracteata Jacq. (s) (= Pedilanthus bracteatus)
Euphorbia bracteolaris Boiss.
Euphorbia brakdamensis N.E.Br. (s)
Euphorbia brandegei Millsp.
Euphorbia brassii P.I.Forst. (s)
Euphorbia braunsii N.E.Br. (s)
Euphorbia bravoana Svent. (s)
Euphorbia breviarticulata Pax (s)
Euphorbia breviarticulata var. breviarticulata (s)
Euphorbia breviarticulata var. trunciformis S.Carter (s)
Euphorbia brevicornu Pax
Euphorbia brevirama N.E.Br. (s)
Euphorbia brevis N.E.Br. (s)
Euphorbia brevitorta P.R.O.Bally (s)
Euphorbia briquetii Emb. & Maire
Euphorbia brittonii Millsp. (s)
Euphorbia broteri Daveau
Euphorbia brownii Baillon
Euphorbia brunellii Chiov. (s)
Euphorbia bruntii (Proctor) Oudejans
Euphorbia bruynsii L.C.Leach (s)
Euphorbia bryophylla Donn.Sm.
Euphorbia bubalina Boiss. (s)
Euphorbia buchtormensis C.A.Mey. ex Ledeb.
Euphorbia buhsei Boiss.
Euphorbia bulbispina Rauh & & Razaf. (s)
Euphorbia bulleyana Diels
Euphorbia bungei Boiss.
Euphorbia bupleurifolia Jacq. (s)
Euphorbia bupleuroides Desf.
Euphorbia burchellii Müll.Arg.
Euphorbia burgeri M.G.Gilbert;; (s)
Euphorbia burmanica Hook.f.
Euphorbia burmannii  (Klotzsch & Garcke) E.Mey. ex Boiss. (s)
Euphorbia buruana Pax (s)
Euphorbia buschiana Grossh.
Euphorbia bussei Pax (s)
Euphorbia bussei var. bussei (s)
Euphorbia bussei var. kibwezensis  (N.E.Br.) S.Carter (s)
Euphorbia buxoides Radcl.-Sm. (s)
Euphorbia bwambensis S.Carter (s)

C

Euphorbia cactus Ehrenb. ex Boiss. (s)
Euphorbia cactus var. cactus (s)
Euphorbia cactus var. tortirama Rauh & Lavranos (s)
Euphorbia caducifolia Haines (s)
Euphorbia caecorum Mart. ex Boiss.
Euphorbia caeladenia Boiss.
Euphorbia caerulans Pax (s)
Euphorbia caesia Kar. & Kir.
Euphorbia caespitosa Lam. (s)
Euphorbia calabarica Burkill
Euphorbia calamiformis P.R.O.Bally & S.Carter
Euphorbia calcarata (Schltdl.) V.W.Steinm. (s) (= Pedilanthus calcaratus)
Euphorbia calcicola Fernald
Euphorbia californica Benth. (s)
Euphorbia californica var. californica (s)
Euphorbia californica var. hindsiana (Benth.) Wiggins (s)
Euphorbia caloderma S.Carter (s)
Euphorbia calonesica Croizat
Euphorbia calva N.E.Br.
Euphorbia calyculata Kunth (s)
Euphorbia calyptrata Coss. & Durieu ex Coss. & Kralik
Euphorbia camagueyensis (Millsp.) Urb.
Euphorbia cameronii N.E.Br. (s)
Euphorbia canariensis L. (s) - Canary Island spurge
Euphorbia candelabrum (Kotschy (s)
Euphorbia candelabrum var. bilocularis (N.E.Br.) S.Carter (s)
Euphorbia candelabrum var. candelabrum (s)
Euphorbia cannellii L.C.Leach (s)
Euphorbia capansa Ducke
Euphorbia caperonioides R.A.Dyer & P.G.Meyer
Euphorbia capillaris Gagnep.
Euphorbia capitellata Engelm.
Euphorbia capitulata Rchb.
Euphorbia capmanambatoensis Rauh (s)
Euphorbia cap-saintemariensis Rauh (s)
Euphorbia capuronii Ursch & Leandri (s)
Euphorbia caput-aureum Denis (s)
Euphorbia caput-medusae L. (s) - Medusa's head
Euphorbia caracasana  (Klotzsch & Garcke) Boiss. (s)
Euphorbia cardiophylla Boiss. & Heldr. ex Boiss.
Euphorbia carinifolia N.E.Br.
Euphorbia carinulata P.R.O.Bally & S.Carter (s)
Euphorbia carissoides F.M.Bailey
Euphorbia carniolica Jacq.
Euphorbia carpartica Wol. emend. Pilát
Euphorbia cartaginiensis Porta 1892 (E. carthaginiensis?) 
Euphorbia carteriana P.R.O.Bally (s)
Euphorbia carullae Sennen
Euphorbia carunculata Waterf.
Euphorbia carunculifera L.C.Leach (s)
Euphorbia carunculifera ssp. carunculifera (s)
Euphorbia carunculifera ssp. subfastigiata L.C.Leach (s)
Euphorbia cassia Boiss.
Euphorbia cassythoides Boiss. (s)
Euphorbia castillonii Lavranos (s)
Euphorbia catamarcensis (Croizat) Subils
Euphorbia cataractarum S.Carter (s)
Euphorbia catenata (S.Carter) Bruyns (s) (= Monadenium catenatum)
Euphorbia caterviflora N.E.Br. (s)
Euphorbia cattimandoo Elliot ex Wight (s)
Euphorbia caucasica Dubovik ex Dubovik & Klokov
Euphorbia caudiculosa Boiss.
Euphorbia cayensis Millsp. (s)
Euphorbia cedrorum Rauh & Hebding (s)
Euphorbia celastroides Boiss. (s)
Euphorbia celata R.A.Dyer (s)
Euphorbia celerieri (Emb.) Vindt
Euphorbia centunculoides Kunth (s)
Euphorbia ceratocarpa Ten.
Euphorbia cereiformis L. (s) - Milk barrel
Euphorbia ceroderma I.M.Johnst. (s)
Euphorbia cervicornu Baillon
Euphorbia chaborasia Gomb.
Euphorbia chaculana Donn.Sm. (s)
Euphorbia chaetocalyx Boiss.
Euphorbia chamaecaula Weath.
Euphorbia chamaeclada Ule
Euphorbia chamaepeplus Boiss. & Gaill. ex Boiss.
Euphorbia chamaepeplus var. chamaepeplus
Euphorbia chamaepeplus var. angustifolia A.Danin
Euphorbia chamaerrhodos Boiss.
Euphorbia chamaesula Boiss.
Euphorbia chamaesyce L.
Euphorbia chamaesyce ssp. chamaesyce
Euphorbia chamaesyce ssp. massiliensis (DC.) Thell.
Euphorbia chamaesycoides B.Nord.
Euphorbia chamissonis  (Klotzsch & Garcke ex Klotzsch) Boiss.
Euphorbia chankoana Vorosch.
Euphorbia chapmanii Oudejans
Euphorbia characias L. (s)
Euphorbia characias ssp. characias (s)
Euphorbia characias ssp. wulfenii  (Hoppe ex W.D.J.Koch) Radcl.-Sm. (s)
Euphorbia charleswilsoniana V.Vlk (s)
Euphorbia cheiradenia Boiss. & Hohen. ex Boiss.
Euphorbia cheirolepioides Rech.f.
Euphorbia cheirolepis Fisch. & C.A.Mey. ex Ledeb.
Euphorbia chenopodiifolia Boiss.
Euphorbia chersina N.E.Br. (s)
Euphorbia chersonesa Huft
Euphorbia chevalieri (N.E.Br.) Bruyns (s) (= Monadenium chevalieri)
Euphorbia chiapensis Brandegee
Euphorbia chimaera Lipsky
Euphorbia chiogenes (Small) Oudejans
Euphorbia chiogenoides Rusby
Euphorbia chiribensis V.W.Steinm. & Felger
Euphorbia chrysochaeta W.Fitzg.
Euphorbia chrysocoma H.Lév. & Vaniot ex H.Lév.
Euphorbia cibdela N.E.Br. (s)
Euphorbia cinerascens Engelm.
Euphorbia cinera W.Fitzg.
Euphorbia citrina S.Carter
Euphorbia clandestina Jacq. (s)
Euphorbia clarae (Malaisse & Lecron) Bruyns (s) (= Monadenium clarae)
Euphorbia clarkeana Hook.f.
Euphorbia classenii P.R.O.Bally & S.Carter (s)
Euphorbia clava Jacq. (s)
Euphorbia clavarioides Boiss. (s)
Euphorbia clavarioides var. clavarioides (s)
Euphorbia clavarioides var. truncata  (N.E.Br.) A.C.White, R.A.Dyer & B.Sloane (s)
Euphorbia clavidigitata Gage
Euphorbia clavigera N.E.Br. (s)
Euphorbia claytonioides Pax
Euphorbia clementei Boiss.
Euphorbia clementei ssp. clementei
Euphorbia clementei ssp. faurei  (Maire) J.Vicens, Molero & C.Blanché
Euphorbia clementei ssp. villosa  (Faure & Maire) J.Vicens, Molero & C.Blanché
Euphorbia clementii Domin
Euphorbia clivicola R.A.Dyer (s)
Euphorbia clusiifolia Hook. & Arn.
Euphorbia coalcomanensis (Croizat) V.W.Steinm. (s) (= Pedilanthus coalcomanensis)
Euphorbia coccinea Roth
Euphorbia coerulescens Haw. (s)
Euphorbia cofradiana Brandegee
Euphorbia coghlanii F.M.Bailey
Euphorbia cognata  (Klotzsch & Garcke) Boiss.
Euphorbia colimae Rose
Euphorbia colchica (Litv.) D.V.Geltman
Euphorbia colletioides Benth. (s)
Euphorbia colliculina A.C.White, R.A.Dyer & B.Sloane (s)
Euphorbia collina Phil.
Euphorbia colligata V.W.Steinm. (s) (= Pedilanthus connatus)
Euphorbia colorata Engelm. (s)
Euphorbia colubrina P.R.O.Bally & S.Carter (s)
Euphorbia columnaris P.R.O.Bally (s)
Euphorbia comans W.Fitzg.
Euphorbia commersonii Baillon emend. Denis
Euphorbia commutata Engelm. - Tinted woodland spurge
Euphorbia comosa Vell. (s)
Euphorbia complanata Warb. (s)
Euphorbia complexa R.A.Dyer (s)
Euphorbia compressa Boiss.
Euphorbia concanensis Janarth. & S.R.Yadav
Euphorbia condylocarpa M.Bieb. (s)
Euphorbia conferta (Small) Oudejans
Euphorbia confinalis R.A.Dyer (s)
Euphorbia confinalis ssp. confinalis (s)
Euphorbia confinalis ssp. rhodesica L.C.Leach (s)
Euphorbia confluens Nel (s)
Euphorbia conformis N.E.Br.
Euphorbia congenera Blume
Euphorbia congestiflora L.C.Leach (s)
Euphorbia coniosperma Boiss. & Buhse
Euphorbia connata Boiss.
Euphorbia consanguina Schrenk ex Fisch. & C.A.Mey.
Euphorbia consobrina N.E.Br. (s)
Euphorbia consoquitlae Brandegee
Euphorbia conspicua N.E.Br. (s)
Euphorbia contorta L.C.Leach (s)
Euphorbia contoversa N.E.Br.
Euphorbia convolvuloides Hochst. ex Hook. & Benth.
Euphorbia conzattii V.W.Steinm. (s) (= Pedilanthus pulchellus)
Euphorbia cooperi N.E.Br. ex A.Berger (s) - Transvaal candelabra tree, lesser candelabra tree
Euphorbia cooperi var. calidicola L.C.Leach (s)
Euphorbia cooperi var. cooperi (s)
Euphorbia cooperi var. ussanguensis (N.E.Br.) L.C.Leach (s)
Euphorbia copiapina Phil. (s)
Euphorbia corallioides L. - Coral spurge
Euphorbia cordatella Oudejans
Euphorbia cordifolia Elliott
Euphorbia cornastra (Dressler) Radcl.-Sm.
Euphorbia corniculata R.A.Dyer (s)
Euphorbia cornigera Boiss.
Euphorbia corollata L. - Flowering spurge
Euphorbia correllii M.C.Johnst.
Euphorbia correntina D.Parodi
Euphorbia corsica Req.
Euphorbia corymbosa N.E.Br. (s)
Euphorbia cossoniana Boiss.
Euphorbia cotinifolia L. (s)
Euphorbia cotinifolia ssp. cotinifolia (s)
Euphorbia cotinifolia ssp. cotinoides  (Miq.) Christenh. (s) - Mexican shrubby spurge, red spurge, Caribbean copper plant
Euphorbia coudercii Gagnep.
Euphorbia cowellii  (Millsp. ex N.L.Britton) Oudejans (s)
Euphorbia cozumelensis Millsp.
Euphorbia craspedia Boiss.
Euphorbia crassinodis Urb.
Euphorbia crassipes Marloth (s)
Euphorbia crebrifolia S.Carter
Euphorbia cremersii Rauh & Razaf. (s)
Euphorbia cremersii var. cremersii (s)
Euphorbia cremersii var. cremersii fa. viridiflora Rauh (s)
Euphorbia cremersii var. rakotozafyi  (Cremers) Rauh (s)
Euphorbia crenata (N.E.Br.) Bruyns (s) (= Monadenium crenatum)
Euphorbia crenulata Engelm. - Chinese caps
Euphorbia crepitata L.C.Wheeler
Euphorbia crepuscula (L.C.Wheeler) V.W.Steinm. & Felger
Euphorbia cressoides M.C.Johnst.
Euphorbia cretophila Klokov
Euphorbia crispa  (Haw.) Sweet (s)
Euphorbia cristata Heyne ex A.W.Roth
Euphorbia croizatii Leandri (s)
Euphorbia crossadenia Pax & K.Hoffmann ex Pax
Euphorbia crotonoides Boiss.
Euphorbia crotonoides ssp. crotonoides
Euphorbia crotonoides ssp. narokensis S.Carter
Euphorbia cruentata Graham
Euphorbia cryptocaulis M.G.Gilbert (s)
Euphorbia cryptospinosa P.R.O.Bally (s)
Euphorbia cuatrecasii Pau ex Cuatrec.
Euphorbia cubensis Boiss. (s)
Euphorbia cuchumatensis Standl. & Steyerm.
Euphorbia culminicola Ant.Molina
Euphorbia cumbrae Boiss.
Euphorbia cumulata R.A.Dyer (s)
Euphorbia cumulicola (Small) Oudejans
Euphorbia cuneata Vahl (s)
Euphorbia cuneata ssp. cretacea S.Carter (s)
Euphorbia cuneata ssp. cuneata (s)
Euphorbia cuneata ssp. lamproderma S.Carter (s)
Euphorbia cuneata ssp. spinescens (Pax) S.Carter (s)
Euphorbia cuneata ssp. spinescens var. pumilans S.Carter (s)
Euphorbia cuneata ssp. spinescens var. spinescens (s)
Euphorbia cuneata ssp. wajirensis S.Carter (s)
Euphorbia cuneifolia Guss.
Euphorbia cuneneana L.C.Leach (s)
Euphorbia cuneneana ssp. cuneneana (s)
Euphorbia cuneneana ssp. rhizomatosa L.C.Leach (s)
Euphorbia cupricola (Malaisse & Lecron) Bruyns (s) (= Monadenium cupricola)
Euphorbia cuprispina S.Carter (s)
Euphorbia cupularis Boiss. (s) (= Synadenium cupulare)
Euphorbia curocana L.C.Leach (s)
Euphorbia curtisii Engelm. ex Chapm. - Curtis' spurge
Euphorbia curvirama R.A.Dyer (s)
Euphorbia cuspidata Bertol.
Euphorbia cussonioides P.R.O.Bally (s)
Euphorbia cyathophora Murray (s) - Wild poinsettia
Euphorbia cylindrica A.C.White, R.A.Dyer & B.Sloane (s)
Euphorbia cylindrifolia Marn.-Lap. & Rauh (s)
Euphorbia cylindrifolia ssp.cylindrifolia (s)
Euphorbia cylindrifolia ssp. tuberifera Rauh (s)
Euphorbia cymbifera (Schltdl.) V.W.Steinm. (s) (= Pedilanthus cymbiferus)
Euphorbia cymbiformis Rusby
Euphorbia cyparissias L. - Cypress spurge
Euphorbia cyparissioides Pax
Euphorbia cypria Boiss.
Euphorbia cyri V.W.Steinm. (= Pedilanthus tomentellus)
Euphorbia cyrtophylla (Prokh.) Prokh.
Euphorbia czerepanovii D.V.Geltman

D

Euphorbia daghestanica D.V.Geltman
Euphorbia dahurica Peschkova
Euphorbia dalettiensis M.G.Gilbert (s)
Euphorbia dallachyna Baillon
Euphorbia damarana L.C.Leach (s)
Euphorbia damasoi Oudejans
Euphorbia darbandensis N.E.Br. (s)
Euphorbia dasyacantha S.Carter (s)
Euphorbia dauana S.Carter (s)
Euphorbia davidii Subils - David's spurge
Euphorbia daviesii E.A.Bruce (s)
Euphorbia davisii M.S.Khan
Euphorbia davyi N.E.Br. (s)
Euphorbia dawei N.E.Br. (s)
Euphorbia debilispina L.C.Leach (s)
Euphorbia descampsii (Pax) Bruyns (s) (= Monadenium descampsii)
Euphorbia decaryi Guillaumin (s)
Euphorbia decaryi var. ampanihyensis Cremers (s)
Euphorbia decaryi var. decaryi (s)
Euphorbia decaryi var. robinsonii Cremers (s)
Euphorbia decaryi var. spirosticha Rauh & Buchloh (s)
Euphorbia decepta N.E.Br. (s)
Euphorbia decidua P.R.O.Bally & L.C.Leach (s)
Euphorbia decipiens Boiss. & Buhse
Euphorbia decliviticola L.C.Leach (s)
Euphorbia decorsei Drake (s)
Euphorbia dedzana L.C.Leach (s)
Euphorbia deflexa Sibth. & J.E.Smith
Euphorbia defoliata Urb. (s)
Euphorbia degeneri Sherff
Euphorbia deightonii Croizat (s)
Euphorbia dekindtii Pax (s)
Euphorbia delicatula Boiss.
Euphorbia delicatissima S.Carter
Euphorbia delphinensis Ursch & Leandri (s)
Euphorbia deltobracteata (Prokh.) Prokh.
Euphorbia deltoidea Engelm. ex Chapm.
Euphorbia deltoidea ssp. adhaerens (Small) Oudejans
Euphorbia deltoidea ssp. deltoidea
Euphorbia deltoidea ssp. deltoidea var. deltoidea
Euphorbia deltoidea ssp. deltoidea var. serpyllum (Small) Oudejans
Euphorbia deltoidea ssp. pinetorum (Small) Oudejans
Euphorbia demissa L.C.Leach (s)
Euphorbia dendroides L. (s)- Tree spurge
Euphorbia denisiana Guillaumin (s)
Euphorbia denisii Oudejans (s)
Euphorbia densa Schrenk
Euphorbia densiflora Klotzsch & Garcke ex Klotzsch
Euphorbia densifolia K.Koch
Euphorbia densispina S.Carter (s)
Euphorbia densiuscula Popov
Euphorbia densiusculiformis (Pazij) Botsch. ex Botsch. & Tscherneva
Euphorbia dentata Michx. - Toothed spurge
Euphorbia dentata var. dentata
Euphorbia dentata var. lasiocarpa Boiss.
Euphorbia denticulata Lam.
Euphorbia dentosa I.M.Johnst.
Euphorbia depauperata Hochst. ex A.Rich. (s)
Euphorbia depauperata var. depauperata (s)
Euphorbia depauperata var. laevicarpa Friis & Vollesen (s)
Euphorbia depauperata var. trachycarpa (Pax) S.Carter (s)
Euphorbia depauperata var. tsetserrensis S.Carter (s)
Euphorbia deppeana Boiss.
Euphorbia derickii V.W.Steinm.
Euphorbia desmondii Keay & Milne-Redh. (s)
Euphorbia dhofarensis S.Carter (s)
Euphorbia diazlunana (Lomelí & Sahagún) V.W.Steinm. (s) (= Pedilanthus diazlunanus)
Euphorbia dichroa S.Carter (s)
Euphorbia didiereoides Denis & Leandri (s)
Euphorbia digestiva Rojas Acosta
Euphorbia digitata S.Watson
Euphorbia dilunguensis (Malaisse & Lecron) Bruyns (s) (= Monadenium dilunguense)
Euphorbia dilobadena S.Carter (s)
Euphorbia diminuta S.Carter
Euphorbia dimorphocaulon P.H.Davis ex Rech.f. (s)
Euphorbia dinteri A.Berger
Euphorbia dioeca Kunth
Euphorbia discoidea (P.R.O.Bally) Bruyns (s) (= Monadenium discoideum)
Euphorbia discoreoides Boiss.
Euphorbia discoreoides ssp. discoreoides
Euphorbia discoreoides ssp. attenuata V.W.Steinm.
Euphorbia disclusa N.E.Br.
Euphorbia discoidalis Chapm., 1860
Euphorbia discolor Ledeb.
Euphorbia discrepans S.Carter (s)
Euphorbia dispersa L.C.Leach (s)
Euphorbia dissitispina L.C.Leach (s)
Euphorbia distans W.Fitzg.
Euphorbia disticha Engelm. ex Boiss.
Euphorbia distinctissima L.C.Leach (s)
Euphorbia diuretica Larrañaga
Euphorbia djimilensis Boiss.
Euphorbia dolichoceras S.Carter (s)
Euphorbia doloensis M.G.Gilbert (s)
Euphorbia donii Oudejans
Euphorbia dorsiventralis Urb.
Euphorbia dracunculoides ;Lam.
Euphorbia dracunculoides ssp. dracunculoides
Euphorbia dracunculoides ssp. inconspicua (J.Ball) Maire
Euphorbia dregeana E.Mey. ex Boiss. (s)
Euphorbia dressleri V.W.Steinm. (s) (= Pedilanthus gracilis)
Euphorbia drummondii Boiss.
Euphorbia drupifera Thonn. (s) (= Elaeophorbia drupifera)
Euphorbia dubovikii Oudejans
Euphorbia duckei Oudejans
Euphorbia dugandiana Croizat
Euphorbia dulcis L. - Sweet spurge
Euphorbia dumalis S.Carter
Euphorbia dumenticola P.R.O.Bally & S.Carter (s)
Euphorbia dunensis S.Carter (s)
Euphorbia durandoi Chabert
Euphorbia duranii Ursch & Leandri (s)
Euphorbia duranii var. ankaratrae Ursch & Leandri (s)
Euphorbia duranii var. duranii (s)
Euphorbia duriuscula Pax & K.Hoffmann ex Herzog
Euphorbia duseimata R.A.Dyer (s)
Euphorbia dussii Krug & Urb. ex A.Duss
Euphorbia duvalii H.Lecoq & Lamotte
Euphorbia dwyeri D.G.Burch

E

Euphorbia eanophylla Croizat
Euphorbia ebracteolata Hayata
Euphorbia ebracteolata var. ebracteolata
Euphorbia ebracteolata var. anhweiensis (Hurus.) Oudejans
Euphorbia echinulata (Stapf) Bruyns (s) (= Monadenium echinulatum)
Euphorbia echinus Hook. & Cosson (s)
Euphorbia ecklonii (Klotzsch & Garcke) Baillon (s)
Euphorbia ecorniculata Kitam.
Euphorbia edgeworthii Boiss.
Euphorbia edmondii Hochr.
Euphorbia eduardoi L.C.Leach (s)
Euphorbia eggersii Urb.
Euphorbia eglandulosa V.W.Steinm.
Euphorbia eichleri Müll.Arg.
Euphorbia eilensis S.Carter (s)
Euphorbia einensis G.Will. (s)
Euphorbia einensis var. anemoarenicola G.Will. (s)
Euphorbia einensis var. einensis (s)
Euphorbia elastica Jum.
Euphorbia eleanoriae (M.E.Lawr. & W.L.Wagner) Govaerts
Euphorbia elegans Spreng.
Euphorbia elegantissima P.R.O.Bally & S.Carter (s)
Euphorbia ellenbeckii Pax (s)
Euphorbia elliotii Leandri (s)
Euphorbia ellipsifolia Gilli
Euphorbia elodes Boiss.
Euphorbia elquiensis Phil.
Euphorbia elwendica Stapf
Euphorbia elymaitica Bornm.
Euphorbia emetica Padilla
Euphorbia emirnensis Baker
Euphorbia engelmannii Boiss.
Euphorbia engleri Pax
Euphorbia engleriana Dinter (s)
Euphorbia enopla Boiss. (s)
Euphorbia enopla var. enopla (s)
Euphorbia enopla var. viridis A.C.White, R.A.Dyer & B.Sloane (s)
Euphorbia enormis N.E.Br. (s)
Euphorbia ensifolia Baker
Euphorbia enterophora Drake (s)
Euphorbia enterophora ssp. crassa Cremers (s)
Euphorbia enterophora ssp. enterophora (s)
Euphorbia ephedroides E.Mey. ex Boiss. (s)
Euphorbia ephedroides var. debilis L.C.Leach (s)
Euphorbia ephedroides var. ephedroides (s)
Euphorbia ephedroides var. imminuta L.C.Leach & G.Will. (s)
Euphorbia ephedromorpha Bartlett (s)
Euphorbia epicyparissias  (Klotzsch & Garcke) Boiss.
Euphorbia epilobiifolia W.T.Wang
Euphorbia epiphylloides Kurz (s)
Euphorbia epithymoides L. (see also Euphorbia polychroma, cushion spurge)
Euphorbia equisetiformis A.Stewart (s)
Euphorbia eranthes R.A.Dyer & Milne-Redh. (s)
Euphorbia eriantha Benth. - Beetle spurge, Mexican pointsetta
Euphorbia ericoides Lam.
Euphorbia erigavensis S.Carter (s)
Euphorbia erinacea Boiss. & Kotschy ex Boiss.
Euphorbia eriophora Boiss.
Euphorbia erlangeri Pax (s)
Euphorbia ernestii N.E.Br. (s)
Euphorbia erubescens Boiss.
Euphorbia erythradenia Boiss.
Euphorbia erythrina Link
Euphorbia erythrocephala P.R.O.Bally & Milne-Redh. (s)
Euphorbia erythroclada Boiss.
Euphorbia erythrocucullata Mangelsdorff
Euphorbia erythrodon Boiss. & Heldr. ex Boiss.
Euphorbia erythroxyloides Baker
Euphorbia esculenta Marloth (s)
Euphorbia espinosa Pax (s)
Euphorbia estevesii N.Zimm. & P.J.Braun (s)
Euphorbia esula L. - Leafy spurge
Euphorbia esuliformis S.Schauer ex Nees & S.Schauer
Euphorbia etuberculata P.R.O.Bally & S.Carter (s)
Euphorbia eugeniae Prokh.
Euphorbia euonymclada Croizat
 N.E.Br. (s)
Euphorbia evansii Pax (s)
Euphorbia excelsa A.C.White, R.A.Dyer & B.Sloane (s)
Euphorbia excisa Urb. & Ekman
Euphorbia exigua L. - Dwarf spurge
Euphorbia exilis L.C.Leach ex L.C.Leach & G.Will. (s)
Euphorbia exilispina S.Carter (s)
Euphorbia exserta (Small) Coker ex Clewell - Coastal sand spurge
Euphorbia exstipulata Engelm. - Square-seed spurge
Euphorbia exumensis (Millsp.) Correll
Euphorbia eyassiana P.R.O.Bally & S.Carter (s)
Euphorbia eylesii Rendle

F

Euphorbia falcata L. - Sickle spurge
Euphorbia famatamboay F.Friedmann & Cremers (s)
Euphorbia famatamboay ssp. famatamboay (s)
Euphorbia famatamboay ssp. itampolensis F.Friedmann & Cremers (s)
Euphorbia fanshawei L.C.Leach (s)
Euphorbia fascicaulis S.Carter (s)
Euphorbia fasciculata Thunb. (s)
Euphorbia faucicola L.C.Leach (s)
Euphorbia fauriei H.Lév. & Vaniot – Korean mountain spurge
Euphorbia feddemae McVaugh
Euphorbia fendleri Torr. & A.Gray
Euphorbia ferganensis B.Fedtsch. ex O.Fedtsch. & B.Fedtsch. (s)
Euphorbia ferox Marloth (s)
Euphorbia fianarantsoae Ursch & Leandri (s)
Euphorbia fidjiana Boiss.
Euphorbia fiherenensis Poiss. (s)
Euphorbia filicaulis Urb.
Euphorbia filiflora Marloth (s)
Euphorbia filiflora var. filiflora (s)
Euphorbia filiflora var. nana G.Will. (s)
Euphorbia filiformis (P.R.O.Bally) Bruyns (s) (= Monadenium chevalieri var. filiforme, Monadenium filiforme)
Euphorbia filipes Benth.
Euphorbia fimbriata Scop. (s)
Euphorbia finkii (Boiss.) V.W.Steinm. (= Pedilanthus finkii)
Euphorbia fischeri Pax
Euphorbia fischeriana Steud.
Euphorbia fissispina P.R.O.Bally & S.Carter (s)
Euphorbia fistulosa M.S.Khan
Euphorbia flanaganii N.E.Br. (s)
Euphorbia flavicoma DC.
Euphorbia flerowii Woronow ex Flerov
Euphorbia floribunda Engelm. ex Boiss.
Euphorbia florida Engelm.
Euphorbia floridana Chapm. - Greater Florida spurge
Euphorbia fluminis S.Carter (s)
Euphorbia foliiflua Ule
Euphorbia foliolosa Boiss.
Euphorbia foliosa (Klotzsch & Garcke ex Klotzsch) N.E.Br. (s)
Euphorbia fontqueriana Greuter
Euphorbia formosana Hayata
Euphorbia forolensis L.E.Newton (s)
Euphorbia forskalii J.Gay
Euphorbia fortissima L.C.Leach (s)
Euphorbia fortuita A.C.White, R.A.Dyer & B.Sloane (s)
Euphorbia fosbergii (J.Florence) Govaerts
Euphorbia fractiflexa S.Carter & J.R.I.Wood (s)
Euphorbia fragifera G.Jan
Euphorbia francescae L.C.Leach
Euphorbia franchetii B.Fedtsch.
Euphorbia franckiana A.Berger (s)
Euphorbia francoana Boiss.
Euphorbia francoisii Leandri (s)
Euphorbia francoisii var. crassicaulis Rauh (s)
Euphorbia francoisii var. francoisii (s)
Euphorbia frankii Lavranos (s)
Euphorbia franksiae N.E.Br. (s)
Euphorbia franksiae var. franksiae (s)
Euphorbia franksiae var. zuluensis A.C.White, R.A.Dyer & B.Sloane (s)
Euphorbia fraseri Boiss.
Euphorbia friedrichiae Dinter (s)
Euphorbia friesii (N.E.Br.) Bruyns (s) (= Monadenium friesii)
Euphorbia friesiorum  (A.Hässl.) S.Carter (s)
Euphorbia frutescens N.E.Br. (s)
Euphorbia fruticosa Forssk. (s)
Euphorbia fruticulosa Engelm. ex Boiss.
Euphorbia fulgens Karw. ex Klotzsch - Scarlet plume
Euphorbia fulva Stapf
Euphorbia furcata N.E.Br. (s)
Euphorbia furcillata Kunth
Euphorbia fusca Marloth (s)
Euphorbia fuscolanata Gilli
Euphorbia fusiformis Buch.-Ham. ex D.Don (s)
Euphorbia fwambensis (N.E.Br.) Bruyns (s) (= Monadenium fwambense)

Notes

References 
  (2006): A new subgeneric classification for Euphorbia (Euphorbiaceae) in southern Africa based on ITS and psbA-trnH sequence data. Taxon 55(2): 397–420. HTML abstract
 & al. (2010). World Checklist of Malpighiales. The Board of Trustees of the Royal Botanic Gardens.
  (2003): The submersion of Pedilanthus into Euphorbia (Euphorbiaceae). Acta Botanica Mexicana 65: 45-50. PDF fulltext [English with Spanish abstract]
  (2002): Phylogenetic relationships in Euphorbieae (Euphorbiaceae) based on ITS and ndhF sequence data. Annals of the Missouri Botanical Garden 89(4): 453–490.  (HTML abstract, first page image)

External links

Lists
Euphorbia